The Bosnia and Herzegovina women's national under-17 football team represents Bosnia and Herzegovina in international football's under-17 categories and is controlled by the Football Association of Bosnia and Herzegovina.

Competitive record

UEFA Women's U17 Championship record

Current squad

See also
 Bosnia and Herzegovina women's national football team
 Bosnia and Herzegovina women's national under-19 football team
 UEFA Women's Championship
 UEFA Women's Under-17 Championship
 FIFA U-17 Women's World Cup
 Football Association of Bosnia and Herzegovina

External links
 Bosnia and Herzegovina women's national under-17 football team at UEFA.com

Women's national under-17 association football teams
under